Owatonna is a city in Steele County, Minnesota, United States. The population was 25,599 at the 2010 census. It is the county seat of Steele County. Owatonna is home to the Steele County Fairgrounds, which hosts the Steele County Free Fair in August.

Interstate 35 and U.S. Highways 14, and 218 are three of the main routes in the city.

History

Owatonna was first settled in 1853 around the Straight River. The community was named after the Straight River, which in the Dakota language is Wakpá Owóthaŋna. A popular, but apocryphal, story is that the town is named after "Princess Owatonna", the daughter of local Native American Chief Wadena who was supposedly healed by a nearby spring's magic waters, which were said to be rich in iron and sulfur. The earliest the Owatonna area was settled was in 1854. It was platted in September 1855, incorporated as a town on August 9, 1858, and as a city on February 23, 1865.

In 1856, Josef Karel Kaplan emigrated from the village of Dlouhá Třebová, southeast of Prague, Bohemia (now the Czech Republic), and selected a quarter section [] of land near the town of Owatonna. Kaplan described Owatonna as having just 50 small homes, but predicted 100 within a year, along with a railroad. With just four stores and a pharmacy, Owatonna quickly prospered and grew to 1,500 inhabitants in just 5 years. Kaplan wrote about the Owatonna area in letters donated to the Minnesota Historical Society. In them, he described often seeing the indigenous people with "tough constitutions...brown skin and good dispositions", adding: "When you read about battles between whites and Indians, it is the whites who are to blame." In 1866, Kaplan helped organize the Catholic cemetery, and a year later, the Bohemian National Cemetery of Owatonna.

Kaplan's Woods is part of the land originally owned by Josef Kaplan, and later Victor and Anna Kaplan. The State of Minnesota created Kaplan's Wood State Park, which was later transferred to the City of Owatonna. The parkway includes Lake Kohlmier, a  lake.

The Minnesota State Public School for Dependent and Neglected Children was built in 1886. The school took in orphans from around the state and taught them "the value of drill, discipline, and labor." The children who died in the institution were interred in the Children's Cemetery behind the school. In 1945, the orphanage closed and in 1947 the State Public School was officially abolished and all its lands, buildings, property, and funds were transferred to the newly established the Owatonna State School, which provided academic and vocational training for the developmentally disabled. The Owatonna State School was closed June 30, 1970. In 1974, the City purchased the compound for its office space. Renamed "West Hills," it continues to serve as the City's administration complex and home to many nonprofit civic organizations including a senior activity center, the Owatonna Arts Center, two nonprofit daycare centers, a chemical dependency halfway house, and Big Brothers/Big Sisters, among others.

In July 2008, a Raytheon Hawker 800 corporate jet crashed near Owatonna, resulting in eight deaths.

On October 31, 2010, Owl City's Adam Young held a hometown concert in the Owatonna Senior High School gym.

On November 3, 2015, the Owatonna Public School District passed a bond referendum to fund school facilities improvements focusing on deferred maintenance, safety, and Elementary school crowding. As a result, the school district received $77.9 million to repair all buildings, replace out-of-date equipment, update security in all seven public school buildings, switch the use for two school buildings, and reconfigure grades from K-5, 6, 7-8, 9-12 to K-5, 6-8, 9-12. All facility changes and projects were completed by September 2018.

The Steele County Historical Society "preserves Steele County's past, shares the county's stories, and connects people with history in meaningful ways, for today and for tomorrow." Established in 1949 to preserve the history of Steele County, it has become one of the largest and most prestigious historical societies in the state. In 1962, the Society permanently leased part of the southeast section of the fairgrounds to begin a pioneer village, the Village of Yesteryear, which has grown in the years since through the additional move of historic structures, as well as museum buildings built on site.

Geography
The oldest part of the city (including the downtown area) is on a low-lying area on the eastern bank of the Straight River, extending towards the south from Maple Creek. The city has grown in all directions, and now lies on both sides of the river, as well as above the ridge north of Maple Creek. Significant growth in recent years has occurred to the northeast, where homes have been built along the ravine of Maple Creek as well as alongside Brooktree Golf Course, to the north, and to the southeast. Geographical landmarks of note include Kaplan's Woods, a hardwood nature preserve on the southern border of the city; Cinder Hill, a steep 60-foot hill on Linn Avenue overlooking downtown that local athletes use for training; the Straight River dam, originally used to power a mill and now reconstructed to include a fish ladder; and the Forest Hill Cemetery, an old wooded cemetery on the ridge north of Maple Creek that marks the boundary between the oldest parts of the city and more recent developments.

Record rainfall events from September 22 to 24, 2010, caused flooding of the Straight River and Maple Creek in and near Owatonna, with developments in the floodplains of both streams completely inundated.

Climate

Demographics

2010 census
As of the census of 2010, 25,599 people, 10,068 households, and 6,737 families resided in the city. The racial makeup of the city was 91.2% White, 3.8% African American, 0.3% Native American, 0.9% Asian, 2.2% from other races, and 1.5% from two or more races. Hispanic or Latino of any race were 7.3% of the population.

There were 10,068 households, of which 34.1% had children under the age of 18 living with them, 52.9% were married couples living together, 10.0% had a female householder with no husband present, 4.0% had a male householder with no wife present, and 33.1% were non-families. 27.9% of all households were made up of individuals, and 11.4% had someone living alone who was 65 years of age or older. The average household size was 2.49 and the average family size was 3.05.

The median age in the city was 37.2 years. 26.9% of residents were under the age of 18; 7.3% were between the ages of 18 and 24; 26.3% were from 25 to 44; 25.5% were from 45 to 64; and 13.8% were 65 years of age or older. The gender makeup of the city was 48.8% male and 51.2% female.

2000 census
As of the census of 2000, 22,434 people, 8,704 households, and 5,936 families resided in the city. The racial makeup of the city was 94.09% White, 1.56% African American, 0.13% Native American, 0.99% Asian, 0.03% Pacific Islander, 1.92% from other races, and 1.27% from two or more races. Hispanic or Latino of any race were 4.31% of the population.

There were 8,704 households, of which 35.4% had children under the age of 18 living with them, 56.5% were married couples living together, 8.4% had a female householder with no husband present, and 31.8% were non-families. 26.6% of all households were made up of individuals, and 10.5% had someone living alone who was 65 years of age or older. The average household size was 2.52 and the average family size was 3.08.

In the city, the population was spread out, with 28.1% under the age of 18, 8.4% from 18 to 24, 29.8% from 25 to 44, 20.8% from 45 to 64, and 12.9% who were 65 years of age or older. The median age was 35. For every 100 females, there were 95.0 males. For every 100 females age 18 and over, there were 90.5 males.

The median income for a household in the city was $45,660, and the median income for a family was $54,883. Males had a median income of $37,691 versus $25,511 for females. The per capita income for the city was $20,513. About 4.3% of families and 6.6% of the population were below the poverty line, including 7.9% of those under 18 and 6.9% of those 65 or over.

Economy
Owatonna is an economic center of Southern Minnesota, with diverse industries. Federated Insurance is the largest employer, with 1,521 employees, followed by an expanding Viracon, which has 1,434 employees. Both have their corporate headquarters in Owatonna. Other large employers in the community are Bosch, Jostens, Gopher Sport, Brunswick Corporation (Cybex International), Daikin Industries, Owatonna Public Utilities, AmesburyTruth, ISD 761, Wenger Corporation, Owatonna Clinic - Mayo Health System, and Owatonna Hospital - Allina Hospitals & Clinics.

Arts and culture

In 1974, the City of Owatonna purchased the campus of the former Minnesota State Public School for Dependent and Neglected Children, which had been in operation from 1886 until 1945. The site was renamed West Hills, and now serves as an administrative center for the City of Owatonna, as well as housing several nonprofit organizations in the various historic buildings, including the Owatonna Arts Center.

The ongoing practical joke Pesky Pants took place in Owatonna between 1965 and 1989

Sites of interest

National Farmers Bank

In the middle of Owatonna's downtown is the National Farmer's Bank, widely recognized as one of the premier examples of the Prairie School of architecture in America. Designed by Louis Sullivan, the building was finished in 1908 and features gold leaf arches, stained-glass windows, and nouveau Baroque art designs, all still in pristine condition. It is a national landmark on the National Register of Historic Places and functions as a branch of Wells Fargo Bank.

State School Museum
The State School Museum is at West Hills on the grounds of the former Minnesota State School for Dependent and Neglected Children.

Sports
The Steele County Blades is a junior hockey team that plays at Four Seasons Center and is a member of the MN Junior Hockey League. Although having a similar name and logo, this team is unrelated to the former Southern Minnesota Express, which relocated to Michigan to become the Motor City Machine. The Express began play in the 2008-2009 season, and completed its final season in March 2011.

Government
Owatonna is governed by a mayor and city council.City Council of Owatonna, MN

 Mayor: Thomas A. Kuntz
City council
 Council member at large: Doug Voss
 Council member at large: Daniel Boeke
 First Ward: Nathan Dotson
 Second Ward: Greg Schultz
 Third Ward: Dave Burbank
 Fourth Ward: Kevin P. Raney
 Fifth Ward: Brent Svenby

The city is in Minnesota's 24th Senate District, represented by John Jasinski, a Republican. District 24 includes portions of Steele, Rice and Waseca and Dodge counties in the southeastern part of the state. Owatonna is in House District 24A, represented by State Representative John Petersburg, a Republican, since 2012.

Owatonna is in Minnesota's 1st congressional district, represented by Brad Finstad, a Republican.

Education

Public schools
Public education is provided by Independent School District No. 761

Elementary schools
 Lincoln Elementary, grades K-5
 McKinley Elementary, grades K-5
 Washington Elementary, grades K-5
 Wilson Elementary, grades K-5

Middle school
Owatonna Middle School, grades 6-8

High school
 Owatonna Senior High School, grades 9-12
 Owatonna Alternative Learning Center (ALC), grades 7-12

Private schools
 Owatonna Christian School, grades K-12
 St. Marys Catholic School, grades K-8
 Marian Catholic High School, 1958-1975
 Pillsbury Baptist Bible College, 1886-2008

Higher education
 Riverland Community College

Past schools
 "Old" Lincoln Elementary School, 1885-1951
 Roosevelt Elementary School, 1919-1980
 Jefferson Elementary School, early 1900s-1970
 First Owatonna High School, 1871-1882
 Second Owatonna High School, 1883-1921
 Minnesota State School for Dependent and Neglected Children, 1887-1945
 Owatonna State School, 1947-1970
 Willow Creek Intermediate School, 1990-2017
 Owatonna Junior High school 1965-2017

Owatonna Art Education Project
In Owatonna was the Owatonna Art Education Project.

Media

AM radio

FM Radio

Film location
Parts of the 1995 movie Angus were filmed in and around Owatonna, including Owatonna Senior High School, its football team, and marching band.

Much of the 2014 silent film The Root of Evil was shot on location in Owatonna, most notably at the Owatonna Senior High School and the Gainey Center. Produced by a cast and crew of over 60 Owatonna High School students, the film has received 10 awards at over eight film festivals on the international circuit. Memorabilia from the film is set to be on display in the high school museum.

Notable people

 Ken Christianson, artist and musician, graduate of Owatonna Senior High
 Masanori Mark Christianson, art director and musician, graduate of Owatonna Senior High
 Lillian Colton, crop artist
 Casey Driessen, fiddler
 Elijah Easton, farmer and member of the Minnesota House of Representatives
 Arthur Fry, co-creator of the Post-it Note, born in Owatonna
 Theodore Marcus Hansen, Lutheran pastor and educator, pastor in Owatonna from 1948 to 1952
 Mike Hegstrand, professional wrestler, Hawk, half of the Road Warriors, 1958-2003; born in Owatonna, resided on Xerxes Ave.
 Noel Jenke, NFL player
 Felix Kaplan, member of the Minnesota House of Representatives
 William R. Kinyon early member of the Minnesota House of Representatives and Speaker of the Minnesota House of Representatives
 Don Laughlin, founder of the resort town of Laughlin, Nevada, born and raised in Owatonna
 Drew C. MacEwen, state representative in Washington state, born in Owatonna
 Charles Edward Magoon, politician, lawyer, judge, and diplomat
 E.G. Marshall, actor known as unflappable Juror #4 in 12 Angry Men and for the TV series The Defenders, born in Owatonna
 Craig Minowa, lead singer of Cloud Cult and founder of Minnesota record label Earthology Records
 Tom Moore, NFL coach
 Harold S. Nelson, Minnesota state senator and lawyer
 Fred L. Peterson, mayor of Portland, Oregon, from 1953 to 1956
 Connie Ruth, Minnesota state representative
 Tom J. Shea, Minnesota state legislator and businessman
 Kevin Skaff, lead guitarist of the rock band A Day to Remember
 Clifford C. Sommer, Minnesota state senator and businessman
 Amy Tanner, psychologist who wrote Studies in Spiritism, born in Owatonna
 Sean Tillman a.k.a. Har Mar Superstar, raised in Owatonna
 Evan S. Tyler, North Dakota State Representative
 Harry Williams, songwriter, director for Mack Sennett; graduated from Pillsbury Military Academy
 Travis Wiuff, a.k.a. "Diesel", MMA fighter, UFC
 Adam Young, a.k.a. Owl City, co-founder of Windsor Airlift, singer-songwriter and multi-instrumentalist
 William C. Zamboni, Minnesota state senator and mayor of Owatonna

References

External links

 City of Owatonna Website
 Owatonna Area Chamber of Commerce and Tourism

Cities in Minnesota
Cities in Steele County, Minnesota
County seats in Minnesota
Dakota toponyms